Ibom Air is a Nigerian airline owned by the Akwa Ibom State Government.

History
The airline commenced operations on June 7 2019 when a Bombardier CRJ900 aircraft marked with the Ibom Air name took off from Victor Attah International Airport (IATA: QUO), Uyo, with government officials on board, en route to Muritala Muhammed International Airport in Lagos. Akwa Ibom is the first state in the country to own an airline. 

In May 2021, the airline also signed Nigeria's first domestic codeshare agreement with Dana Air.  Dana Air COO Obi Mbanuzuo said the agreement is "the first of its kind for domestic airlines in Nigeria". Mr Mbanuzuo added: "We do hope that this partnership... will set a positive precedent for the greater good of the industry".

Destinations

Fleet
As of May 2021, Ibom Air has the following fleet:

References

Airlines of Nigeria
Airlines established in 2019
Government of Akwa Ibom State
Nigerian companies established in 2019